Paraxanthodes polynesiensis is a species of crab found in the French Polynesian Exclusive Economic Zone.

References

Crustaceans described in 1993